12th Street Jump is a weekly public radio series, which is broadcast in the United States as well as over internet radio stations around the world. The show is based in Kansas City, where it began broadcasting from in 2009. The show focuses on two genres, Jazz and Blues, while including regular comedy segments. David Basse and Eboni Fondren (Pearl Rovaris MacDonald prior to 2014) are the show's hosts. They regularly have guests on the show, and interview leading Jazz and Blues artists.

In 2015, the show had spread its reach to over 115 stations across the United States.

History 

12th Street Jump began broadcasting in 2009.  It is produced by Theater League in Kansas City. The public radio show is a weekly show, focusing on Jazz, Blues and also comedy segments. The show is recorded at the Green Lady Lounge, 1809 Grand Avenue, on Wednesday nights from 7:30 to 9:00pm in Kansas City. 

It was first broadcast on KCUR FM89.3, Kansas City's public radio station. Its first broadcast came from the Mutual Musicians Foundation, a historic building in the Historic 18th and Vine Jazz district, where Dizzy Gillespie is rumored to have met Charlie Parker. 

In 2010, the show moved to 12th Street Rag, a club located in downtown Kansas City. A renovation of the hotel where the club is located forced the show to move to its current location. It is now recorded live at the Broadway Jazz Club for subsequent broadcast on stations across the United States.  

In 2017, the show was aired on 60 public radio stations in the United States on a weekly basis.

Background

The weekly show is one hour long, combining Jazz and Blues with topical sketch comedy, similar to shows such as Saturday Night Live and Prairie Home Companion. The show is hosted by Pete Weber and Eboni Fondren (Pearl Rovaris MacDonald prior to 2014), who regularly interview Jazz and Blues musicians on their show. 12th Street Jump celebrates the birthday of a major jazz or blues musical influence on each show. 

The show commonly features the music of various Jazz and Blues artists including John Coltrane, Thelonious Monk, Duke Ellington and Louis Armstrong as well as composers like George Gershwin and Johnny Mercer.

Guests

The show regularly features guests from a variety of backgrounds, including vocalists, drummers, trumpet players, saxophonists and guitarists. The variety of guests gives the show diversity. Guests have included Karrin Allyson, Kevin Mahogany, Jeff Hamilton, Joe Sample, Randy Brecker, Wycliffe Gordon, Sean Jones,  Christian McBride, and Rod Fleeman.

Comedy

Each week comedy sketches are presented on each weekly broadcast, incorporating Jazz and Blues themes. Their weekly "Blues in the News" feature spoofs celebrities and politicians and has received national coverage. Other sketches include "Dr Pearl", "Eboni," " Ask the Professor," Serena's School for Scat," "The Jazz Mechanics," "So What's Your Question", "Sonny Zoot Reedman – Sax Therapist" and "Who's Got the Blues". Each Sketch has a unique approach, more often than not relating back to Blues or Jazz.

Personnel
CURRENT

 Eboni Fondren (Host)
 Jackie Myers (Pianist and Musical Director)
 David Basse (Vocalist)
 Tyrone Clark (Bass)
 Jim Lower (Drums)
 Derek Djovig (Audio Engineer)
 Paul Seaburn (Writer)
 Mark Edelman (Creator, Executive Producer)

PAST MEMBERS INCLUDE

 Pete Weber (Host 2009-2018)
 Pearl Rovaris Ma
cDonald (Host 2009-2014)
 Joe Cartwright (Pianist and Musical Director 2009-2018)
 Mike Warren (Drums 2009-2016)
 Todd Strait (Drums 2016-?)
 Nedra Dixon (Vocalist 2009-2014)
 Ian York (Director)
 Chad Meise (Audio Engineer 2009-2014)

References

2010s American radio programs
2000s American radio programs
American variety radio programs
American public radio programs
2009 radio programme debuts